

This is a list of the National Register of Historic Places listings in Providence, Rhode Island.

This is intended to be a complete list of the properties and districts on the National Register of Historic Places in Providence, Rhode Island, United States. Latitude and longitude coordinates are provided for many National Register properties and districts; these locations may be seen together in an online map.

There are 433 properties and districts listed on the National Register in Providence County, including 15 National Historic Landmarks. The city of Providence is the location of 169 these properties and districts, including 12 National Historic Landmarks; they are listed here. Properties and districts located in the county's other municipalities are listed separately. Two listings, the Blackstone Canal and the Norwood Avenue Historic District, extend into other parts of Providence County.

Current listings

|}

Former listings

|}

See also

 List of National Historic Landmarks in Rhode Island
 National Register of Historic Places listings in Rhode Island

References

External links
RI Historical Preservation and Heritage Commission list of all RI properties on the NRHP list, including PDF's of most of the applications

 01
.N
.
Culture of Providence, Rhode Island
.N
Providence
Providence, Rhode Island